Hans Morant (born 7 October 1947) is a German bobsledder. He competed in the four man event at the 1976 Winter Olympics.

References

1947 births
Living people
German male bobsledders
Olympic bobsledders of West Germany
Bobsledders at the 1976 Winter Olympics
People from Sławno County